Georges Vuilleumier (21 September 1944 – 29 July 1988) was a Swiss football striker.

Career
Born in Tramelan, Canton of Bern, Vuilleumier began his football career with FC La Chaux-de-Fonds where he won the Nationalliga A in 1964.

He played 19 times and scored 2 goals for Switzerland between 14 November 1964 and 18 November 1973. He was an unused substitute at the 1966 World Cup.

Clubs
 1962-1966 : FC La Chaux-de-Fonds (league champion 1964)
 1966-1977 : Lausanne-Sports
 1977-1978 : FC Fribourg
 1978-1979 : FC La Chaux-de-Fonds

References

External links

1944 births
1988 deaths
People from the Bernese Jura
1966 FIFA World Cup players
Swiss men's footballers
Switzerland international footballers
FC La Chaux-de-Fonds players
FC Lausanne-Sport players
Association football forwards
Sportspeople from the canton of Bern